John Ward may refer to:

Academia
John Ward (academic) (1679–1758), English Gresham Professor of Rhetoric
John Clive Ward (1924–2000), British physicist
John Manning Ward (1919–1990), Vice-Chancellor and history professor at the University of Sydney
John Mason Ward (1921–2014), British chemist
John Milton Ward IV (1917–2011), musicologist and Professor of Music at Harvard University
John Sebastian Marlowe Ward (1885–1949), British historian, Freemason and spiritualist
John William Ward (professor) (1922–1985), professor of English and history, and president of Amherst College

Arts
John Ward (actor) (1704–1773), English actor
John Ward (American actor) (1923–1995), American actor
John Ward (composer) (1590–1638), English composer
John Ward (painter) (1798–1849), English marine artist
John Powell Ward (born 1937), English poet and academic
John Quincy Adams Ward (1830–1910), American sculptor
John Stanton Ward (1917–2007), English painter
Johnny Ward (actor) (born 1987), Irish actor
Johnny Ward (travel blogger) (born 1983), Irish world traveller

Military
John Ward (Medal of Honor) (1848–1911), American Indian Wars soldier and Medal of Honor recipient
John Ward (RAF officer) (1918–1995), British airman, member of Polish resistance during Warsaw Uprising
John Hubert Ward (1870–1938), British army officer and courtier

Public officials
John Ward (1779–1855), British Member of Parliament for Leominster
John Ward, 1st Earl of Dudley (1781–1833), British statesman, 1st Earl of Dudley
John Ward, 1st Viscount Dudley and Ward (1704–1774), British peer and politician
John Ward, 2nd Viscount Dudley and Ward (1725–1788), British peer and politician
John Ward (banker) (c. 1650–1726), British MP, Lord Mayor of London, Governor of the Bank of England
John Ward (Conservative politician) (1925–2010), Conservative MP for Poole, 1979–1997
John Ward (diplomat, died 1890) (1805–1890), British diplomat in Germany
John Ward (economist) (born 1942), British trade unionist and opera administrator
John Ward (loyalist) (1753–1846), businessman and politician in New Brunswick
John Ward (Minnesota politician) (born 1950), retired educator and member of the Minnesota House of Representatives
John Ward (South Carolina politician) (1767–1816), intendent (mayor) of Charleston, South Carolina, 1801–1802
John Ward (trade unionist) (1866–1934), English politician, trade union leader and soldier
John Durbin Ward (1819–1886), Ohio lawyer, politician, newspaper publisher and American Civil War officer
John Elliott Ward (1814–1902), American diplomat and politician
John F. Ward (1904–1973), Speaker of the Maine House of Representatives and President of the Maine Senate
John Guthrie Ward (1909–1991), British ambassador to Argentina and Italy
John M. Ward (1865–1948), Member of the Maine House of Representatives
Sir John MacQueen Ward (born 1940), Scottish businessman
T. John Ward (born 1943), United States federal judge, Eastern District of Texas
John Ward (died 1501), Lord Mayor of London buried in St Paul's Cathedral

Religion
John Ward (archbishop of Cardiff) (1929–2007), Roman Catholic Archbishop of Cardiff, 1983–2001
John Ward (auxiliary bishop of Los Angeles) (1920–2011), Roman Catholic auxiliary bishop in Los Angeles
John Ward (bishop of Leavenworth) (1857–1929), Roman Catholic Bishop of Leavenworth, 1911–1929
John Ward (priest) (died 1860), English Anglican Dean of Lincoln
John Ward (prophet) (1781–1837), Irish preacher and prophet
John Ward (vicar) (1629–1681), English vicar of Stratford-upon-Avon
John C. Ward (1873–1949), bishop of the Episcopal Diocese of Erie

Sports

Cricket
John Ward (cricketer, born 1946) (born 1946), Australian cricketer
John Ward (Derbyshire cricketer) (born 1948), English cricketer for Derbyshire
John Ward (Hampshire cricketer) (active 1877), English cricketer for Hampshire
John Ward (Kent cricketer) (active 1800–1806), English cricketer in Kent
John Ward (New Zealand cricketer) (1937–2021), New Zealand cricketer
John Ward (umpire) (born 1962), Australian cricket umpire

Other sports
John Ward (1920s footballer) (active 1925–26), English footballer
John Ward (American football) (1948–2012), American footballer
John Ward (Australian footballer) (1928–2017), Australian rules footballer
John Ward (broadcaster) (1930–2018), American radio broadcaster
John Ward (footballer, born 1951) (born 1951), English footballer and manager
John Ward (outfielder) (active 1884), American baseball outfielder
John Ward (pitcher) (1862–1899), American baseball pitcher
John Ward (rugby) (1873–1939), English rugby player
John Montgomery Ward (1860–1925), American baseball player
John T. Ward Jr. (1945–2021), American horse trainer
Johnny Ward (American football) (1907–1968), American football player
Johnny Ward (rugby league) (c. 1941–2019), English rugby player
Jay Ward (baseball) (John Francis Ward, 1938–2012), American baseball player and coach

Other
John Ralph Hansford Ward, known as Hansford Ward (1817–1903), also his son with the same name, ship owners and captains of South Australia

See also
Death of John Ward, Irish Traveller shot dead in 2004
Jack Ward (c. 1553–1622), English pirate and Barbary Corsair
Jonathan Ward (disambiguation)
John Warde (disambiguation)